was a women's football team which played in Division 1 of Japan's Nadeshiko League. It founded the league back in 2000 and disbanded in 2011. It evolved into Vegalta Sendai Ladies in 2012.

Results

Transition of team name 
YKK Tohoku Ladies SC Flappers : 1997–2003
YKK AP Tohoku Ladies SC Flappers : 2004
TEPCO Mareeze : 2005–2011

References

External links 
Japanese women's club teams

Women's football clubs in Japan
1997 establishments in Japan
American football teams established in 1997
Defunct football clubs in Japan
Sports teams in Fukushima Prefecture
2011 disestablishments in Japan
American football teams disestablished in 2011